Fiji competed at the 2017 Asian Indoor and Martial Arts Games held in Ashgabat, Turkmenistan. 28 athletes competed in 4 different sports. Fijian team won 2 medals including one gold and a silver medal in the Games.

Fiji also made its first appearance at an Asian Indoor and Martial Arts Games event along with other Oceania nations including Australia.

Participants

Medallists

References 

Nations at the 2017 Asian Indoor and Martial Arts Games
2017 in Fijian sport